Anucha is a Thai word of Pali/Sanskrit origin anujā meaning "younger brother". It is also used as a given name. People with the given name Anucha include:

Anucha Browne Sanders, American former women's basketball player, former executive for the New York Knicks of the NBA
Anucha Chaiyawong (born 1985), Thai footballer who played for Thailand Premier League side Provincial Electricity Authority FC
Anucha Chuaysri (born 1979), professional footballer from Thailand
Anucha Kitpongsri (born 1983), Thai footballer
Anucha Munjarern (born 1979), Thai futsal player who is futsal's top international goalscorer of all time
Anucha Nakasai (born 1960), Thai Minister to the Office of the Prime Minister
Anucha Suksai (born 1992), Thai footballer

Thai names